Prinsburg is a city in Kandiyohi County, Minnesota, United States. The population was 497 at the 2010 census.

History
Prinsburg was originally platted in 1886 by Martin Prins, a partner in the Dutch real estate firm Prins and Zwanenburg. Prins and his business partner Theodore Koch began offering land for sale in and around Prinsburg in 1885, and the town appeared shortly thereafter.

The city of Prinsburg was incorporated as a village in June 1952.

Geography

Minnesota State Highway 7 serves as a main route in the community.  Kandiyohi County Road 1 also passes through Prinsburg.

Demographics

2010 census
As of the census of 2010, there were 497 people, 207 households, and 142 families living in the city. The racial makeup of the city was 97.4% White, 1.2% African American, 0.4% Asian, 0.6% from other races, and 0.4% from two or more races. Hispanic or Latino of any race were 1.2% of the population.

There were 207 households, of which 28.5% had children under the age of 18 living with them, 66.7% were married couples living together, 0.5% had a female householder with no husband present, 1.4% had a male householder with no wife present, and 31.4% were non-families. 30.0% of all households were made up of individuals, and 21.2% had someone living alone who was 65 years of age or older. The average household size was 2.40 and the average family size was 2.94.

The median age in the city was 42.1 years. 25.8% of residents were under the age of 18; 5.9% were between the ages of 18 and 24; 21.2% were from 25 to 44; 21.8% were from 45 to 64; and 24.9% were 65 years of age or older. The gender makeup of the city was 49.1% male and 50.9% female.

2000 census
As of the census of 2000, there were 458 people, 188 households, and 141 families living in the city. The racial makeup of the city was 99.13% White, 0.44% Asian, 0.44% from other races. Hispanic or Latino of any race were 0.44% of the population.

There were 188 households, out of which 29.3% had children under the age of 18 living with them, 73.4% were married couples living together, 0.5% had a female householder with no husband present, and 25.0% were non-families. 24.5% of all households were made up of individuals, and 17.6% had someone living alone who was 65 years of age or older.  The average household size was 2.44 and the average family size was 2.89.

In the city, the population was spread out, with 24.9% under the age of 18, 6.1% from 18 to 24, 21.4% from 25 to 44, 21.4% from 45 to 64, and 26.2% who were 65 years of age or older.  The median age was 43 years. For every 100 females, there were 96.6 males.  For every 100 females age 18 and over, there were 91.1 males.

The median income for a household in the city was $38,125, and the median income for a family was $41,136. Males had a median income of $36,563 versus $17,321 for females. The per capita income for the city was $21,545.  About 1.4% of families and 2.3% of the population were below the poverty line, including none of those under age 18 and 7.9% of those age 65 or over.

Politics

The last Republican candidate for president to receive less than 82% of the vote in Prinsburg was Gerald Ford in 1976.

Culture 
Prinsburg is known as one of Minnesota's most conservative cities. The local school district (Common School District 815) is one of two public school districts in Minnesota that do not operate a public school. There is only a private religious school (Central Minnesota Christian School) in Prinsburg.

References

Cities in Kandiyohi County, Minnesota
Cities in Minnesota